Seamus Finnegan (born 1949) is a Northern Irish playwright. He lives in London, and was born in Belfast Northern Ireland on 1 March 1949.

Early life 
Born in Belfast Northern Ireland, he is the son of Mary (née Magee) and Billy Finnegan, a bricklayer. He went to St Mary's Grammar School where he was taught by the Irish Christian Brothers. At the outbreak of 'the Troubles' in Northern Ireland, he became a member of the Northern Ireland Civil Rights Movement and the People's Democracy (a left wing student group led by amongst others, Bernadette McAliskey née Devlin). In 1971 he went to Manchester to read English, Drama and Education where he graduated and qualified as a teacher. He later moved to London where he taught at the Jews' Free School from 1974 to 1978.

Career 
Finnegan's first major play Act of Union was produced in 1980 at the Soho Poly Theatre with the support of  Bill Ash and of which Irving Wardle wrote in The Times: "It may seem a negative compliment to this extremely informative and well-written piece, but its main achievements are to have developed a highly theatrical pattern from dislocated fragments, and to have exposed some of the tangled loyalties and hatreds of the divided country without the smallest trace of sectarian bias". Soldiers, North and Mary's Men soon followed in the quartet of 'Troubles' plays.

In 1982, at the invitation of Kariel Gardosh, the Israeli Cultural Attaché in London, Finnegan's play James Joyce And The Israelites was performed at the First International Conference and Festival of Jewish Theater in Tel Aviv. "An evening of undivided enjoyment... a non-Jewish play on a Jewish subject done with much understanding and sympathy" (Jerusalem Post).

In 1984, Tout, a play about informers in Northern Ireland was commissioned by the Royal Shakespeare Company and performed at the Barbican as part of the Thought Crimes At The Barbican season in memory of George Orwell and his 1984.

1986 saw the production of The War Trilogy which included The Spanish Play, The German Connection and subsequently for BBC Radio 3 The Cemetery of Europe. Of The German Connection, which opened at the Young Vic, Andrew Rissik wrote in The Independent: 'Seamus Finnegan's The German Connection is an outstanding new play whose theme is tellingly summarised in the line, "Betrayal can make monsters of people... Finnegan's writing cuts through the potential melodrama with heart-breaking perception and skill... his dialogue has an urgent workaday vigour..."

In the mid-nineties, Finnegan was writer in residence at Mishkenot Sha’ananim in Jerusalem, where he collaborated with Israeli dramatist Miriam Kainy on Hypatia and began work on his book about Israeli playwrights, Dialogues In Exile, with the help and support of Dani Horovitz, another Israeli dramatist.

Since 1998, Finnegan has worked closely with Scottish theatre director and artist, Ken McClymont on more than seven productions, most notably, Dead Faces Laugh, Disapora Jigs, Murder In Bridgport and Spinoza and with Madani Younis at the Bush Theatre in 2012 on The Star In The Cross, a play set in the Budapest ghetto and Jerusalem in 1944.

Finnegan's latest work with director Ken McClymont: After Paris at Rosemary Branch Theatre in 2016 and I Am Of Ireland at Old Red Lion Theatre in June 2018, of which Julia Pascal wrote in londongrip, 'an epic piece of theatre rooted in Irish identity, politics and history';'a vivid production in sympathy with poetry of writing'.

List of Plays 

 Laws of God, Half Moon Theatre, 1978
 Act of Union, Soho Poly, 1980
 Herself Alone, Old Red Lion, 1981
 Soldiers, Old Red Lion, 1981
 James Joyce and the Israelites, Lyric Studio and First International Festival of Jewish Theatre, 1982
 Tout, Royal Shakespeare Company, Barbican, 1984
 North, Cockpit Theatre, 1984
 Beyond a Joke, Cockpit Theatre and Queen Elizabeth Hall, 1984
 Marys Men, Drill Hall Theatre, 1984
 Gombeen, Air Gallery, 1985
 The Spanish Play, Place Theatre, 1986
 The German Connection, Young Vic, 1986
 The Murphy Girls, Drill Hall Theatre, 1988
 1916, Institute of Contemporary Art, 1989
 Mary Maginn, Drill Hall Theatre, 1990
 Comrade Brennan, 7/84 Scotland, 1991
 It's All Blarney, 1992
 Hypatia, National Theatre Studio, 1994
 Dead Faces Laugh, Old Red Lion, 1998
 Life after Life, Old Red Lion, 2000
 Diaspora Jigs, Old Red Lion, 2001
 Murder in Bridgport, Old Red Lion, 2002
 Waiting for the Angels, Old Red Lion, 2002
 Landscapes after Exile, Lyric Studio, 2006
 The Beautiful Nun, RADA, 2008
 Fear, Misery and Laughter, Old Red Lion, 2010
 Spinoza, Old Red Lion, 2010
 The Star in the Cross, Bush Theatre, 2012
 After Paris, Rosemary Branch Theatre, 2016
 I Am Of Ireland, Old Red Lion, 2018

Radio, TV and Film 

 Doctors' Dilemmas, BBC2, 1983
 The Cemetery of Europe, BBC Radio 3, 1988
 Wild Grass, BBC Radio 4, 1990
 Shadows of Time, screenplay version of The German Connection, 1990
 Run like the Wind, film script commission, 1994

Books 

 North, Marion Boyars, 1987
 The Cemetery of Europe, Marion Boyars, 1991
 James Joyce and the Israelites/Dialogues in Exile, Harwood Academic, 1995
 It's All Blarney, Harwood Academic, 1995
 Dead Faces Laugh, Harwood Academic, 1999
 After Paris, Wild Goat Press, 2017
 Two Jewish Plays, Wild Goat Press, 2017
 I Am Of Ireland, Wild Goat Press, 2018
 Diaspora Jigs, Wild Goat Press, 2019
 Bucksey and Yap, Wild Goat Press, 2019
The Beautiful Nun, Wild Goat Press, 2020.
MURDER IN BRIDGPORT,Wild Goat Press, 2021

References

People educated at St. Mary's Christian Brothers' Grammar School, Belfast
1949 births
Living people
Male dramatists and playwrights from Northern Ireland
Male novelists from Northern Ireland